Giovanni Salviati (24 March 1490 – 28 October 1553) was a Florentine diplomat and cardinal.  He was papal legate in France, and conducted negotiations with the Emperor Charles V.

Biography 
Salviati was born in Florence to Jacopo Salviati, son of Giovanni Salviati and Maddalena Gondi, and Lucrezia di Lorenzo de' Medici, elder daughter of Lorenzo de' Medici. In Rome, he was educated in Latin, Greek, and Hebrew by Marcello Virgilio Adriani and Fra Zanobi Acciajuoli. Pope Leo X, who raised him to the cardinalate in 1517, was Lorenzo's son, and therefore Giovanni's uncle. His brother Bernardo Salviati and nephew Anton Maria Salviati also became cardinals. He was also Cousin of Catherine de' Medici from whom he derived patronage.

He held many posts. He was protonotary apostolic, bishop of Porto e Santa Rufina, and sub-dean of the Sacred College of Cardinals. In 1525, he was sent as a legate to Madrid to negotiate the withdrawal of Imperial troops from the papal states and to help negotiate the release of the captured French King Francis I. In 1526, Salviati signed for his cousin, Pope Clement VII, the treaty formulating the League of Cognac which allied against Charles V. He became Bishop of Albano in 1543. He was appointed Administrator of Oloron Diocese in 1520. and attended the Papal conclave of 1549–50 as a cardinal.

He was on friendly terms with Machiavelli, writing to him. The Mannerist painter Cecchino (Francesco) Salviati (Francesco de' Rossi) took the name Salviati from Giovanni, who was his patron. He employed the composer Jacques du Pont.

Salviati died in Ravenna on 28 October 1553.

Notes

External links

https://web.archive.org/web/20171229105748/http://www.italycyberguide.com/History/factspersons/s.htm
http://www.nuovorinascimento.org/n-rinasc/ipertest/html/orlando/salviati.htm 

1490 births
1553 deaths
16th-century Italian cardinals
Cardinal-bishops of Albano
Cardinal-bishops of Porto
Cardinal-bishops of Sabina
16th-century Italian Roman Catholic bishops
Bishops of Saint-Papoul
Cardinal-nephews
Giovanni